Jakša Cvitanić (born 1962 in Split, Croatia, Yugoslavia) is a Richard N. Merkin Professor of Mathematical Finance at the California Institute of Technology and the director of the Ronald and Maxine Linde Institute of Economic and Management Sciences. His main research interests are in mathematical finance, contract theory, stochastic control theory, and stochastic differential equations.

From 1992 to 1999 he was an Assistant and Associate Professor of Statistics at Columbia University.  From 1999 until 2005, when he joined Caltech, Cvitanić was a Professor of Mathematics and Economics at the University of Southern California. During the academic year 2012-2013 he was a professor of finance at EDHEC Business School in France.
 
Cvitanić has co-authored some fundamental papers on financial markets with portfolio constraints, transaction costs, and other market imperfections. He is the author of over fifty articles in academic finance, economics and mathematics journals,, a co-author, with Fernando Zapatero,  of the textbook Introduction to the Economics and Mathematics of Financial Markets, and, with Jianfeng Zhang, of the monograph Contract Theory in Continuous-time Models.  He was or has been a co-editor of Finance and Stochastics  , Mathematical Finance, Mathematics and Financial Economics  and Frontiers of Mathematical Finance.

Cvitanić earned a B.Sc. (1985) and M.Sc. (1988) in Mathematics from the University of Zagreb, Croatia, and a PhD in Statistics (1992) from Columbia University in New York City. He received the American Statistical Association Scholastic Excellence Award in 1992.


Selected publications
 Advances in Mathematical Finance (edited with E. Jouini and Marek Musiela). New York: Cambridge University Press, 2001. .
 Introduction to the Economics and Mathematics of Financial Markets (with Fernando Zapatero). Cambridge, Mass.: MIT Press, 2004. .
 Contract Theory in Continuous-Time Models (with Jianfeng Zhang). Springer Science+Business Media, 2013. .

References

Further reading

External links
 Cvitanic's web site, caltech.edu
 Research papers, ideas.repec.org
 Portal hrvatskih znanstvenika (out of date)

1962 births
Living people
20th-century American mathematicians
21st-century American mathematicians
Croatian mathematicians
California Institute of Technology faculty
Columbia University alumni
Faculty of Science, University of Zagreb alumni
University of Southern California faculty
Scientists from Split, Croatia
Yugoslav emigrants to the United States
Financial economists